Karjat (station code: KJT/S for South (local)) is a railway station on the Central line of the Mumbai Suburban Railway network. Karjat is a major rail terminus, connected via local trains to Chhatrapati Shivaji Maharaj Terminus Mumbai,  and 

Regular shuttle trains run between Karjat and Pune. Located about halfway between Mumbai and Pune, the town is a famous stop to buy Vada pav, (a popular potato savoury originated from here) when travelling by train between the two cities. Almost all long distance and all short-distance trains halt here.

Karjat has a bus terminal near railway station in Bhisegaon. It is well connected to other cities in and around state by Maharashtra state owned passenger buses.

Gallery

References 

Railway stations in Raigad district
Karjat-Panvel rail line
Karjat-Khopoli rail line
Mumbai Suburban Railway stations
Kalyan-Lonavala rail line